Georges Firmin (15 March 1924 – 12 November 2017) was a French weightlifter. He competed at the 1948 Summer Olympics and the 1952 Summer Olympics.

References

1924 births
2017 deaths
French male weightlifters
Olympic weightlifters of France
Weightlifters at the 1948 Summer Olympics
Weightlifters at the 1952 Summer Olympics
Sportspeople from Montpellier
20th-century French people